Two-time defending champion Barbora Krejčíková and her partner Rajeev Ram defeated Samantha Stosur and Matthew Ebden in the final, 6–1, 6–4 to win the mixed doubles tennis title at the 2021 Australian Open. It was the pair's second major mixed doubles title as a team, after their first at the 2019 Australian Open. They saved a match point en route to the title, in the second round against Ena Shibahara and Ben McLachlan.

Krejčíková and Nikola Mektić were the defending champions, but chose to play separately this year. Mektić partnered Barbora Strýcová, but was defeated in the first round by Hayley Carter and Sander Gillé.

After not being held at the 2020 US Open and postponed 2020 French Open due to the COVID-19 pandemic, this year's tournament marked the return of mixed doubles to a Grand Slam tournament.

Seeds

Draw

Finals

Top half

Bottom half

Other entry information

Wild cards

Alternate pairs

Withdrawals

See also 
2021 Australian Open – Day-by-day summaries

References

External links
 2021 Australian Open – Doubles draws and results at the International Tennis Federation
 Main Draw

Mixed Doubles
Australian Open - Mixed Doubles
Australian Open - Mixed Doubles
Australian Open (tennis) by year – Mixed doubles